Sharla Martiza Isya'iah Putri (born November 7, 2003) is an Indonesian singer. She is known as the winner of the singing talent show The Voice Kids Indonesia the second season that aired on television station Global TV in 2017. In the Blind Audition joined the team Agnez Mo.

The Voice Kids Indonesia 
Sharla became popular in Indonesia after she performed Maher Zain's song Assalamu Alayka during Blind Audition. When Sharla audition sang Cats' Memory song and only Agnez Mo spun, then asked Sharla what kind of song she liked. Sharla replies that she likes Kasidah songs, and then Agnez Mo immediately asks to sing the song of the kasidah and Sharla sings Maher Zain's Assalamu Alayka song. After Sharla sang the song, her video became popular in social media. The video became trending on YouTube for days. Even Maher Zain uploaded the video on his Instagram. At the semi-finals, Sharla had the opportunity to be called by Maher Zain.  Maher Zain reveals if he is happy and amazed when Sharla sings his song which he then uploads on his personal Instagram.

Performances on The Voice Kids Indonesia

Awards and nominations

The Voice Kids Indonesia

Discography 
 Generasi Pemenang (2017)
 Ya Rasulullah (Isfa'lana) (2018)
 Tadarus (2019)
 Rindu Rasulullah (2021)
 Ramadhan (2021)
 Hati Yang Salah (2022)

References

External links 
 
 

21st-century Indonesian women singers
The Voice Indonesia
2003 births
Living people
Indonesian Muslims